Wayne Greenstreet (born 21 January 1949) is a New Zealand cricketer. He played in 24 first-class and seven List A matches for Wellington and Central Districts from 1969 to 1974.

See also
 List of Wellington representative cricketers

References

External links
 

1949 births
Living people
New Zealand cricketers
Wellington cricketers
Central Districts cricketers
Cricketers from Lower Hutt
North Island cricketers